Heart of stone or Heart of Stone may refer to:

Film and television 
 Heart of Stone (1924 film), a German silent film
 Heart of Stone (1950 film), an East German film
 Heart of Stone (2009 film), an American documentary
 Heart of Stone (upcoming film), an American spy film
 "Heart of Stone" (Mysticons), a television episode
 "Heart of Stone" (Once Upon a Time in Wonderland), a television episode
 "Heart of Stone" (Star Trek: Deep Space Nine), a television episode

Music

Albums 
 Heart of Stone (Cher album) or the title cover of the Bucks Fizz song (see below), 1989
 Heart of Stone (Chris Knight album) or the title song, 2008

Songs 
 "Heart of Stone" (Bucks Fizz song), 1988; covered by Cher, 1990
 "Heart of Stone" (Rolling Stones song), 1964
 "Heart of Stone" (Suzi Quatro song), 1982
 "Heart of Stone" (Taylor Dayne song), 1990
 "(Wish I Had A) Heart of Stone", by Baillie & the Boys, 1989
 "Heart of Stone", by Andreas Kümmert, competing to represent Germany in the Eurovision Song Contest 2015
 "Heart of Stone", by Dave Stewart, 1994
 "Heart of Stone", by Erasure from The Innocents, 1988
 "Heart of Stone", by Europe from The Final Countdown, 1986
 "Heart of Stone", by Fleetwood Mac from 25 Years – The Chain, 1992
 "Heart of Stone", by Iko from The Twilight Saga: Breaking Dawn – Part 2 soundtrack, 2012
 "Heart of Stone", by Kenny, 1973
 "Heart of Stone", by Matt Costa from Unfamiliar Faces, 2008
 "Heart of Stone", by Motörhead from Iron Fist, 1982
 "Heart of Stone", by the Raveonettes from In and Out of Control, 2009
 "Heart of Stone", by SVT, 1979
 "Heart of Stone", by Toby Marlow & Lucy Moss from the musical Six, 2018
 "Heart of Stone", by Underoath from Act of Depression, 1999
 "Heart of Stone", by Whitesnake from Flesh & Blood, 2019
 "Heart of Stone", from the musical Six (musical)

Other uses 
 Heart of stone (medicine), calcification of the heart
 "Heart of Stone" (German fairy tale), an 1827 story by Wilhelm Hauff
 Heart of Stone (novel), a 1996 novel by Sebastiano Vassalli

See also 
 Hearts of Stone (disambiguation)
 Heartstone (disambiguation)